The Tecnam P96 Golf is an Italian all-metal side-by-side two-seat single-engine, low wing light aircraft that was designed by Luigi Pascale and built by Tecnam in Naples from 1997 to 2006.

Variants
Golf 80
Powered by  Rotax 912 UL.
Golf 100
Powered by  Rotax 912 ULS engine.

Specifications (P96 Golf 80)

See also

References 

Tecnam aircraft
1990s Italian civil utility aircraft
Single-engined tractor aircraft
Low-wing aircraft
Aircraft first flown in 1996